The 2022 season will be Castleford Tigers's 15th consecutive season playing in England's top division of rugby league. During the season, they will compete in the Super League XXVII and the 2022 Challenge Cup.

Preseason  friendlies

Super League

Regular season

Matches

 

All fixtures are subject to change

Table

Challenge Cup

  

All fixtures are subject to change

Transfers

Gains

Losses

2022 squad

Notes

References

Castleford Tigers seasons
Castleford Tigers